Keli Lake (Qely cad) is a volcanic-glacial lake  in the Akhalgori Municipality, Mtskheta-Mtianeti region of Georgia. Located in Caucasus Mountains, in Keli Highland, at 2914 m above sea level. Stuck between Kharuli and Alevi ranges. The area of surface is 1.28 km², while the catchment area is 7.8 km². Average depth is 24,7 m, maximal depth is 63 m. Gets its feed from snow, rainfall and underground waters. River Ksani outflows from the Lake. Its water is clear.

References 

Lakes of Georgia (country)
Lakes of South Ossetia